The Cardrona Forest is a forest in the Scottish Borders area of Scotland, on the B7062, near Peebles. OS Grid Reference: NT292385.

Cardrona Forest consists of a mixed conifer woodland with upgraded facilities.
It is part of a portfolio of forests managed by Forestry and Land Scotland, including Hyndlee Forest, Swinnie Plantation, Innerleithen Forest, Elibank and Traquair, Yair Forest, Cademuir Forest, Craik Forest, Thornielee Forest, Glentress Forest, Caberston, and Newcastleton Forest.

See also
List of places in the Scottish Borders

References

External links

Forests and woodlands of Scotland
Geography of the Scottish Borders